Birmingham is an unincorporated community in Allen Township, Miami County, in the U.S. state of Indiana.

History
Birmingham was laid out in 1868 by Solomon Jones and Isaac Caulk. It may be named after the industrial city of Birmingham, England. Soon after it was platted, Birmingham contained a flour mill, a blacksmith shop and a general store. A post office was established at Birmingham in 1862, and remained in operation until 1901.

References

Unincorporated communities in Miami County, Indiana
Unincorporated communities in Indiana